Ho Man Lok (born September 27, 1991 in Canada) is a Hong Kong sprinter. He represented Hong Kong at the 2012 Summer Olympics as part of the men's 4x100m relay team. The team didn't win a medal.

External links 
London 2012

1991 births
Canadian male sprinters
Canadian people of Hong Kong descent
Hong Kong male sprinters
Olympic athletes of Hong Kong
Athletes (track and field) at the 2012 Summer Olympics
Canadian emigrants to Hong Kong
Living people
Universiade medalists in athletics (track and field)
Universiade medalists for Hong Kong
Medalists at the 2011 Summer Universiade